The United States House of Representatives elections in California, 1916 was an election for California's delegation to the United States House of Representatives, which occurred as part of the general election of the House of Representatives on November 7, 1916. The delegation's only Independent incumbent retired and the open seat was won by the Democrats.

Overview

Delegation composition

Results

District 1

District 2

District 3

District 4

District 5

District 6

District 7

District 8

District 9

District 10

District 11

See also
65th United States Congress
Political party strength in California
Political party strength in U.S. states
United States House of Representatives elections, 1916

References
California Elections Page
Office of the Clerk of the House of Representatives

External links
California Legislative District Maps (1911-Present)
RAND California Election Returns: District Definitions

1916
California United States House of Representatives
1916 California elections